The BBC New Comedy Award first took place in 1995, and it is considered to be one of the top UK comedy newcomer awards.

It was axed in 2006, being replaced by a nationwide talent hunt that places its emphasis on sketch writing and filmed performance. However, in March 2011 the BBC Radio New Comedy Award was relaunched in conjunction with BBC Radio 2, and ran as a joint project between Radio 2 and BBC Radio 4 Extra. The current arrangement is for 4 Extra to broadcast the heats and semi-finals of the contest, whilst Radio 4 broadcasts the live final.

The finals of this event have boasted many well known names that have continued to work in comedy to great acclaim - amongst the winners of the award are: Julian Barratt (1995), Marcus Brigstocke (1996), Paul Foot (1997), Josie Long (1999), Alan Carr (2001), Nina Conti (2002), Rhod Gilbert (2003), Angela Barnes (2011) and Lost Voice Guy (2014).  Other notable finalists include Peter Kay, Lee Mack, Russell Howard, Daniel Kitson, Justin Lee Collins, David O'Doherty, Shappi Khorsandi, Joe Lycett and Sarah Millican.

Winners & finalists

Notes

References

External links
 
 
 

Awards established in 1995
Awards established in 2011
New Comedy
British comedy and humour awards
Edinburgh Festival
1995 establishments in the United Kingdom
2011 establishments in the United Kingdom